Fernando Raposo (born 7 July 1989), sometimes known as Nando Raposo, is a French professional basketball player. He lastly played for Antibes Sharks of the LNB Pro A league.

References

1989 births
Living people
BCM Gravelines players
Centers (basketball)
Élan Béarnais players
French men's basketball players
Nanterre 92 players
Olympique Antibes basketball players
Orléans Loiret Basket players
SOMB Boulogne-sur-Mer players